SIB or sib may refer to:

Places
 As Sib, a town in Oman
 Sib, Khuzestan, a village in Khuzestan Province, Iran
 Sibiti Airport (IATA airport code), in the Republic of the Congo
 Sunny Isles Beach, Florida, US

Science
 Sib (anthropology), a group of people recognized by an individual as kin
 Sib RNA, a non-coding sRNA found in E. coli
 Simple biosphere model, used with atmospheric general circulation models
 Self-injurious behaviour, in self-injury

Organisations
 School of International Business of the ESB Business School, Reutlingen University, Germany
 Scientex Incorporated Berhad, a producer of stretch films, Malaysia
 Securities and Investments Board, UK later the Financial Services Authority
 Sekolah Indonesia Bangkok, Indonesian School
 Sidang Injil Borneo, the Borneo Evangelical Church
 Special Investigation Branch of UK military police
 Special Investigations Branch of the New Zealand Defence Force Military Police
 Student Welfare Organisation in Bergen (Studentsamskipnaden i Bergen, SiB)
 Swiss Institute of Bioinformatics

Business
 Savings and Investment Bank, a failed bank on the Isle of Man
 South Indian Bank
 Social Investment Business, UK charity

Computing
 Service Implementation Bean, a web service Java object
 scale-index-base byte in x86 processor

Other uses
 Sinar Indonesia Baru, a newspaper in Medan, Indonesia
 Systems in Blue, a German music group
 "S.I.B. (Swelling Itching Brain)", a song from the 1979 Devo album Duty Now for the Future